The  4th Moscow Jewish Film Festival is an annual international film festival, which aims to gather in the program features, documentaries, shorts and animated films on the subject of Jewish culture, history and national identity and contemporary problems. The festival was held in Moscow from 22 to 30 May 2018, at the Jewish Museum and Tolerance Center, Documentary Film Center, cinema GUM, KARO 11 cinema Oktyabr, Moskino Zvezda and Garage Screen Summer Cinema.

Opening film
Opening film of the festival was Denial directed by Mick Jackson. The welcome speech at the Opening ceremony was held by the President of Jury Alexander Rodnyansky and famous American director and producer Brett Ratner. The ceremony was held in cinema Oktyabr which gathered about 1,600 spectators.

Jury 
 Alexander Rodnyansky — President of the jury, producer of TV-shows and feature films, member of the Academy of Motion Picture Arts and Sciences, founder of the first independent Ukrainian TV channel 1+1, CEO of CTC Media broadcasting company
 Brett Ratner — American filmmaker, producer, screenwriter and actor
 Vladimir Kott — Film, TV and theatre director
 Larisa Maliukova — film critic
 Alisa Khazanova — actress of theater and cinema, director
 Vladimir Alenikov — director, writer, translator, screenwriter
 Dmitry Litvinov — producer
 Ilya Bachurin — producer
 Makar Kozhukhov — producer, distributor

Public Council 
A public council, created in 2017, continued its work and included the following filmmakers and leaders of the Jewish community:
 Alexander Boroda, Chairman of the Public Council — Rabbi, the President of the Federation of Jewish Communities of Russia, Founder and General Director of the Jewish Museum and Tolerance Center, a member of the Civic Chamber of the Russian Federation
 Yuri Kanner — President of Russian Jewish Congress, Vice President and member of the steering committee of World Jewish Congress
 Dorit Golender — diplomat, public figure, former Plenipotentiary Ambassador of the State of Israel in the Russian Federation (2010-2015)
 Alexander Mitta — film director, screenwriter
 Garry Koren — diplomat
 Denis Ruzayev — film сritic
 Susanna Alperina — journalist, writer
 David Schneiderov — television and radio presenter, film critic

Creators
 CEO and producer — Egor Odintsov
 Program director — Vanya Bowden
 Producer — Konstantin Fam
 Educational director — Michael Libkin
 Educational manager — Tatyana Bezhenar
 Executive producer — Elena Barkova 
 Line producer — Diana Nadarova 
 Media manager — Margarita Voevodina

Program

Competition 
  Narrative Feature:
 1945 (2017) — Hungary
 Menashe (2017) — United States
 The Invisibles (2017) — Germany
 Disobedience (2017) — United Kingdom, Ireland, United States
 An Act of Defiance (2017) — Netherlands, South Africa
 Foxtrot (2017) — Israel, Germany, France, Switzerland
  Documentary Feature:
 Into_nation of Big Odessa (2018) — Russia, Ukraine 
 Forever Pure (2016) — Israel
 The Dead Nation (2017) — Romania
 WALL (2017) — Canada
 Wall (2017) — Israel
 #uploading_holocaust (2016) — Israel
  Narrative Short:
 Rebel (2016) — United States, Israel
 The Outer Circle (2017) — United Kingdom
 The Giraffe (2017) — Ukraine
 Close the Shutters (2016) — Israel
 Counterlight (2017) — Israel
 Summer (2018) — United States
 My Yiddish Papi (2017) — Canada
 Keep it Cool (2014) — Israel
 The Departure (2017) — Germany
 Adieu My Beloved (2017) — Canada
 Seven Minutes (2017) — Israel
 Shemira (2017) — United Kingdom
 Vanity of vanities (2017) — Russia
  Documentary Short:
 116 cameras (2017) — United States
 Billsville (2017) — Canada
 Vishneva, Belarus Soviet Union Poland (2016) — United States
 The rabbi's most unlikely granddaughter (2017)  — Poland
 Pana Ha'Geshem (2016) — Israel, France
 Lon (2017) — Belgium
 Fathers and Sons (2018) — Hungary
 Wall, Crevice, Tear (2015) — Israel
 Tashlikh (2017) — Israel, Netherlands

Out of Competition 
  Special screenings:
 Towards Jerusalem (1990) — Austria
 Nathan the Wise (1922) — Germany
 Papa (2004) — Russia
  Experimental:
 The Disappeared (2018) — Israel, Germany
 Salarium (2017) — United Kingdom
  Narrative Feature:
 The Cakemaker (2017) — Israel, Germany
 The Young Karl Marx (2017) — France, Belgium, Germany
 Norman: The Moderate Rise and Tragic Fall of a New York Fixer (2016) — Israel, United States
 Denial (2016) — United Kingdom, United States
 Witnesses (2018) — Russia, Belarus, Ukraine, Poland, France, Israel, Czech Republic, Romania
 Keep the Change (2017) — United States
 Fritz Lang (2017) — Germany
  Documentary Feature:
 Bobbi Jene (2017) — Denmark, Israel, United States
 The Wonderful Kingdom of Papa Alaev (2016) — Israel
 Koudelka Shooting Holy Land (2015) — Germany, Czech Republic
 Dreaming of a Jewish Christmas (2017) — Canada
 Muhi: Generally Temporary (2017) — Israel
 The Island (2017) — Israel
 Ink of Yam (2017) — Germany

Education
In addition to film screenings educational program was organized in the framework of the festival. A discussion “Odessa as creative Klondike” dedicated to the film “Into_nation of Big Odessa” took place at Oktyabr Cinema. Following the screening of the documentary “Bobbi Jene” about the woman who dances, fights for her independence and bravely faces its consequences, the guests of the Festival had an opportunity to attend the unusual dancing workshop “Living an artistic image through the body” by Toma Nuevo. A discussion “From patriotism to nationalism. Where the boundaries are?” led by public figure Alexander Kargin and TV-presenters Kirill and Andrey Eykhfus, following the screening of the documentary film “Forever Pure” took place at the Documentary film center. The festival also held the screening of the documentary “Ink of Yam” and the lecture “Ink of Yam. Signs on the skin: social and symbolic functions of tattoos”, where Dr.Oxana Moroz and tattoo master Sergey Pavlov (Mysh) discuss the social, aesthetic and symbolical functions of tattoos in modern society. As a part of the Special screenings program Austrian director Ruth Beckermann had a Q&A session about her past works and future plans. The Jewish Museum and Tolerance center hosted the screening of Nathan the Wise with musical accompaniment by the “Speedball trio” band and arranged theatre director Vladimir Mirzoev’s workshop “Modern directing at the intersection of feature, documentary and digital filmmaking.”

Events 
The 4th Moscow Jewish Film Festival opened with the screening of 'Denial directed by Mick Jackson. The welcome speech at the Opening ceremony was held by the President of Jury Alexander Rodnyansky and famous American filmmaker Brett Ratner. The closing ceremony of the 4th Moscow Jewish Film Festival was held in the Documentary film center. The jurors presented awards in each of the four competition categories and one special prize.
Moreover, within the festival the Honorable prize for outstanding contribution to the development of Jewish cinema in Russia was presented to Vladimir Mashkov for his film “Papa”. This year Yakov Kaller award for the best Russian Jewish film of 2018 was given to Sobibor by Konstantin Khabensky. Sofia Aleksandrovna, Yakov Kaller’s sister, presented the award to producer of “Sobibor” Ilya Vasilyev.

Winners 
 Winner of nomination Narrative Feature — Foxtrot (2017)
 Winner of nomination Documentary Feature — Into_nation of Big Odessa (2018)
 Winner of nomination Narrative Short — Vanity of vanities (2017)
 Winner of nomination Documentary Short — 116 cameras (2017)
 Jury Prize — Menashe (2017)
 Honorable prize for outstanding contribution to the development of Jewish cinema in Russia — Vladimir Mashkov
 Yakov Kaller award — Sobibor (2018)

Partners 
 Federation of Jewish Communities of Russia
 Blavatnik Family Foundation
 Genesis Philanthropy Group
 Russian Jewish Congress
 The network of cinemas "Karo"
 Hotel Metropol Moscow

See also
 Ekaterinburg Jewish Film Festival

References

External links 
 Official website

Film festivals in Russia
2018 film festivals
Jewish film festivals in Europe
2018 in Russian cinema